KSAL-FM (104.9 FM) is a radio station broadcasting a classic hits music format. Licensed to Salina, Kansas, United States, it serves the Salina–Manhattan area. The station is currently owned by Christopher Miller, through licensee Meridian Media, LLC.

The station first went on the air in May 1989 as KCVS, programming religious music. Then, in 1994, John K. Vanier and Jerry Hinrikus, dba EBC, Inc. would buy KCVS and change the call letters to KZBZ. This was accompanied by a format switch to adult contemporary as its slogan became "Breezy 104.9." Broadcast studios were established on south Ohio street. Then in 1999 KZBZ changed format again to Hot AC, brandishing the new slogan "The BUZZ." By this time studios had moved to the Townsite Building on north Santa Fe in downtown Salina. Morris Communications would later acquire the station in January 2004 and flipped the format to classic hits on May 2, 2005. Around this time the call letters changed to KSAL-FM. In 2015, Morris would sell its Salina Media Group to Alpha Media, who would spin the station off to Rocking M Media the following year. In October 2019, Rocking M co-owner Christopher Miller announced he would spin off KSAL-FM, KSAL and KYEZ into a new group called Meridian Media, while Meridian would operate KVOB and KZUH under a local marketing agreement. The sale was approved and consummated the following year.

References

External links

SAL-FM
Radio stations established in 1989
1989 establishments in Kansas
Saline County, Kansas